Khamasi (also Romanized as Khamāsī; also known as Ḩammāsī and Hommāsī) is a village in Elhayi Rural District, in the Central District of Ahvaz County, Khuzestan Province, Iran. At the 2006 census, its population was 206, in 40 families.

References 

Populated places in Ahvaz County